Ivan Savnik was a Slovene industrialist and merchant (1879–1950), one of the biggest manufacturers and retailers in the Upper Carniola region of Slovenia. With his products he supplied merchants across Austria-Hungary and later Yugoslavia. During the time of mayor Ciril Pirc he worked for many years as a councillor and advisor at the city council of Kranj. He was also actively involved in the construction of the National Hall (Narodni dom) in Kranj.

References

1879 births
1950 deaths
Slovenian industrialists
People from Kranj
Austro-Hungarian businesspeople
Yugoslav businesspeople